Loimulohi or loimutettu lohi (Finnish lit. “blazed salmon”) is a Finnish fish preparation, in which salmon (or rainbow trout) is nailed to a plank with wooden pegs and cooked over the radiated heat from an open fire. Wooden pegs are used instead of regular nails because if used, the regular nails would get too hot and sear the meat around them, and in worst case the fish could fall to the ground. The planks are positioned vertically around the edge of the fire at an angle. Loimulohi has also been served as street food.

See also
Plank cooking

References

External links
 Glossary of Finnish Dishes

Finnish cuisine
Fish dishes